The St Andrews Links Trophy is an international amateur golf tournament contested on the St Andrews Links in Scotland. It has been played annually since 1989.

The format is 72-hole stroke play over three days. 144 players compete in the first two rounds after which the leading 40 competitors and ties play a further 36 holes over the Old Course on the final day. The course or courses used for the first two rounds has varied from year to year, with combinations of the Old, New and Jubilee courses used. Before 2003 the event was played over two days. Originally the Old and New courses were used on the opening day. The Jubilee course was first used in 1999.

Winners

Source:

See also
St Rule Trophy

References

External links
Tournament homepage
List of winners

Amateur golf tournaments in the United Kingdom
Golf tournaments in Scotland
Sport in Fife
Annual sporting events in the United Kingdom
1989 establishments in Scotland
Recurring sporting events established in 1989